Exodus FC is a Dominica football club based in Roseau, Dominica. The club competes in the Dominica Premiere League, the top tier of Dominica football.

Honors 
Dominican Division One: 1
 2011–12
Dominica Premiere League: 1
 2014–15

Stadium
Currently the team plays at the 12,000 capacity Windsor Park Cricket Stadium.

References

External links
Soccerway profile

Football clubs in Dominica